Ashish Joshi (born 15 February 1985) is an Indian cricketer. He made his Twenty20 debut on 17 November 2019, for Uttarakhand in the 2019–20 Syed Mushtaq Ali Trophy.

References

External links
 

1985 births
Living people
Indian cricketers
Uttarakhand cricketers
Place of birth missing (living people)